Shau Kei Wan is a station on the Hong Kong MTR  in the neighborhood of Shau Kei Wan. Its station livery is blue.

The retrofitting of platform screen doors was completed in October 2005.

History
Construction of the station commenced in May 1982 on a newly reclaimed area of Aldrich Bay, and was carried out by Gammon Construction. Approximately 110,438 cubic metres of material was excavated during the course of construction. The station is around 12 metres deep and 190 metres long, and was built "bottom-up" within a steel sheet piled cofferdam. The structure was designed to support the new Island Eastern Corridor, an elevated motorway, directly above it.

Shau Kei Wan station opened on 31 May 1985 as part of the first phase of the Island line.

Station layout
Platforms 1 and 2 share the same island platform.

Entrances and exits
A1: Perfect Mount Gardens
A2: Po Man Street
A3: Shau Kei Wan Bus Terminus 
B1: Shau Kei Wan Main Street East 
B2: Hong Kong Museum of Coastal Defence 
B3: Aldrich Bay Road 
C: Mong Lung Street
D1: Tam Kung Temple, Hong Kong Art School 
D2: Aldrich Garden

Transport connections

Hong Kong Tramways (Exit B1)
Hong Kong Island's tram system terminates at Shau Kei Wan. The terminus can be accessed from Exit B1 along Shau Kei Wan Main Street East.

References

Sai Wan Ho
Eastern District, Hong Kong
MTR stations on Hong Kong Island
Island line (MTR)
Railway stations in Hong Kong opened in 1985
1985 establishments in Hong Kong